Friedrich von Hohenzollern (1449–1505) was Prince-Bishop of Augsburg from 1486 to 1505.

Biography

Friedrich von Hohenzollern was born in Hohenzollern in 1449.  He was a member of the House of Hohenzollern.  In 1478, he was ordained as a priest in Mainz.

The cathedral chapter of Augsburg Cathedral elected him Prince-Bishop of Augsburg on 21 March 1486.  Pope Innocent VIII confirmed his appointment on 21 June 1486 and he was consecrated as a bishop by Otto von Sonnenberg, Bishop of Constance, on 17 September 1486.

He died on 8 March 1505.

References

1449 births
1505 deaths
Roman Catholic bishops of Augsburg